Valeisha Butterfield is Vice President of Partnerships & Engagement at Google, Inc and was formerly co-president of The Recording Academy.

Early life and education
Butterfield Jones is the daughter of U.S. Congressman G. K. Butterfield and North Carolina State Legislator Jean Farmer-Butterfield. She graduated from Clark Atlanta University in 2000.

Career

In 2009 she was deputy director of public affairs at the Department of Commerce during the first part of the Obama administration. Between 2011 and 2012 she was part of the Obama for America campaign, as national youth vote director.

In 2016 she worked at Google as global head of women and black community engagement. She organized Decoding Race, an international event for Google employees.

In 2020 she was appointed chief diversity and inclusion officer of The Recording Academy, and in June 2021 became co-president of the company.

Awards
2017: 14th Annual McDonald's 365Black Awards - Honoree
 
2020: 14th Annual ADCOLOR Awards - Honoree

Personal life
Butterfield was married to NBA champion Dahntay Jones from 2011-2022. She previously was engaged to NFL player Julius Peppers and rapper The Game. The two share two children, Dahntay Jr. and Dillon.

References

External links 

Clark Atlanta University alumni

Living people

Year of birth missing (living people)